Grude is a town and a municipality located in West Herzegovina Canton of the Federation of Bosnia and Herzegovina, an entity of Bosnia and Herzegovina.

Geography
Grude is located 49 kilometers from Mostar, 19 kilometers  from Imotski, and 100 km  from Split.

History

Pre-history and ancient times
Testimony about life in these regions are still present in prehistoric times. In place of Ravlić cave, which is located in Drinovci, were found traces of life dating from the later Neolithic period. The life in these regions has been flowing continuously - the peoples, cultures and civilizations have been changing.
In later, but historical times, this soil had very living presence of the Romans, whose commercial road, connecting the two great ancient trading center - Salona and Narona, was passing through the region. Recent archaeological excavations at the site in Gorica confirm that on this soil in ancient times there was a significant Roman settlement.
Middle Ages is a time of tombstones - stećak and in municipality of Grude can be found practically everywhere - which proves that at that time was quite a big life. Undoubtedly it is a merit favorable geographical position of this region, as well as the relatively mild climate, together with rich natural resources. Rarely can see where this unusual combination of brutality and tameness of nature that we find in the region of Imotski-Bekija fields - arable land is relatively rich in water in contrast to the fierce and rocky, which is surrounded by.

Middle ages
The end of the Middle Ages was marked by the Ottoman expansion and conquest.

Modern times

After the Turks, Austria-Hungary arrived. This is a short transitional period in which were built numerous schools and infrastructure needed for the functioning of a modern European state, but this is somehow persistently ignored in the overall modernization.
Like most of the West Herzegovina cities, Grude was labeled as pro-Ustaše region. Therefore, it has been demonized by the officials of SFRY. The investments were very poor in it. That caused huge poverty and lot of people emigrated to Zagreb and Dalmatia, as well as to Germany as gastarbeiter. Today the municipality is among the most developed in Bosnia-Herzegovina, with numerous medium and small business corporations, Violeta paper factory being the biggest brand. Croatian Republic of Herceg-Bosna and the Croatian Defense Council (HVO) were founded in Grude. The Main HQ of the HVO was located in Grude.

Settlements

Demographics

1971
19,203 total
Croats - 19,111 (99.52%)
Serbs - 32 (0.16%)
Muslims - 4 (0.03%)
Yugoslavs - 5 (0.02%)
others - 55 (0.30%)

1991
In the 1991 census, the municipality of Grude had a population of 16,358 residents:
16,210 Croats (99.09%)
9 Serbs (0.05%)
4 Muslims (0.02%)
5 Yugoslavs (0.03%)
130 others (0.79%)

The town of Grude had 3,528 residents; almost all of whom were ethnic Croats.

Economy
During the war in Bosnia and Herzegovina, Grude was one of the bastions of the "rebellion" against the aggression of the Yugoslav Army. The late 1990s and early 2000s were marked by recent war and the struggle for survival, whereas today Grude is experiencing cultural and economic renaissance.

Traffic and road connections
Grude is placed on the crossroads of two big roads: Slavonski Brod-Ploče and Mostar-Split. Through Grude also goes master road M-6 Grude - Ljubuški - Čapljina - Metković. Besides that there are also 3 regional roads:
R 420 Grude - Privalj - Široki Brijeg - Mostar
R 421 Sovići - Klobuk
regional road Grude-Posušje (outside category)

Sports

The town is home to the football club HNK Grude, basketball club HKK Grude, and the female handball club HŽRK Grude. NK Drinovci is based in Drinovci (located in the same municipality). De Boules clubs Grude and Sv. Stipan based in Sovići.

International relations

Twin towns – Sister cities
Grude is twinned with:

 Slunj, Croatia
 Baldissero Torinese, Italy

Notable people
Milan Bandić, former mayor of Zagreb
Mate Boban, first president of Herzeg-Bosnia
Rafael Boban, military commander of Ustaše Militia and Croatian Armed Forces during World War II
Ljubo Jurčić, former Croatian Minister of Economy
Goran Marić, former Croatian Minister of State Property
Mirko Marić, Croatian footballer
Mile Pešorda, Croatian writer
Andrijica Šimić, Herzegovinian hajduk
Antun Branko Šimić, Croatian poet
Blago Zadro, a commander of the northern part of Croatian forces in Vukovar during the Croatian War of Independence

Communications
Radio Grude broadcasts from the town.

References

External links

Official site
Unofficial site

  
Populated places in Grude